The Australia cricket team toured South Africa in February and March 2020 to play three One Day Internationals (ODIs) and three Twenty20 International (T20I) matches. Cricket South Africa confirmed the fixtures for the tour in May 2019. On 17 February 2020, the day after the conclusion of the home series against England, Faf du Plessis announced that he had stepped down as the captain of South Africa's Test and T20I sides. Later the same day, South Africa announced their squad for the T20I series against Australia, with Quinton de Kock as captain and du Plessis included in the team.

The tour marked the return to South Africa of Steve Smith and David Warner. They had last played for Australia in South Africa in the third Test match in March 2018, after being found guilty of ball-tampering during the game. Australia won the T20I series 2–1. In the ODI series, South Africa won the first two matches to take an unassailable lead. South Africa won the third and final ODI match by six wickets, to win the series 3–0. It was South Africa's eighth-consecutive win in ODIs at home against Australia.

Squads

Glenn Maxwell was ruled out of Australia's ODI and T20I squads due to an elbow injury, with D'Arcy Short named as his replacement. Ahead of the second T20I, Reeza Hendricks was added to South Africa's squad, following injuries to Temba Bavuma and Heinrich Klaasen. During the T20I series, Jhye Richardson was added to Australia's ODI squad. Kagiso Rabada suffered a groin injury during the T20I series and was then ruled out of South Africa's ODI squad. Ahead of the second ODI, Temba Bavuma was withdrawn from South Africa's squad due to injury, with Rassie van der Dussen replacing him. Australia's Mitchell Starc flew home ahead of the third ODI, so he could watch his wife, Alyssa Healy, play in the final of the 2020 ICC Women's T20 World Cup. Daryn Dupavillon was added to South Africa's squad for the third ODI.

T20I series

1st T20I

2nd T20I

3rd T20I

ODI series

1st ODI

2nd ODI

3rd ODI

References

External links
 Series home at ESPN Cricinfo

2019–20 South African cricket season
2020 in Australian cricket
2020 in South African cricket
Australian cricket tours of South Africa
International cricket competitions in 2019–20